The second cabinet of Gheorghe Gheorghiu-Dej was the government of Romania from 28 January 1953 to 4 October 1955.

Ministers
The ministers of the cabinet were as follows:

President of the Council of Ministers:
Gheorghe Gheorghiu-Dej (28 January 1953 - 4 October 1955)

First Vice Presidents of the Council of Ministers:
Chivu Stoica (20 August 1954 - 4 October 1955)
Iosif Chișinevschi (20 August 1954 - 4 October 1955)
Alexandru Drăghici (20 August 1954 - 4 October 1955)

Vice Presidents of the Council of Ministers:
Chivu Stoica (28 January 1953 - 20 August 1954)
Emil Bodnăraș (20 August 1954 - 4 October 1955)
Iosif Chișinevschi (28 January 1953 - 20 August 1954)
Petre Borilă (20 August 1954 - 4 October 1955)
Gheorghe Apostol (28 January 1953 - 21 April 1954)
Alexandru Moghioroș (21 April 1954 - 4 October 1955)
Gheorghe Vidrașcu (28 January 1953 - 21 April 1954)
Miron Constantinescu (21 April 1954 - 4 October 1955)

Minister of the Interior:
Pavel Ștefan (28 January 1953 - 4 October 1955)
Minister of the State Security:
Alexandru Drăghici (28 January 1953 - 4 October 1955)
Minister of Foreign Affairs:
Simion Bughici (28 January 1953 - 4 October 1955)
Minister of Justice:
Anton Tatu Jianu (28 January 1953 - 31 May 1954)
Gheorghe Diaconescu (31 May 1954 - 4 October 1955)
Minister of the Armed Forces:
Emil Bodnăraș (28 January 1953 - 4 October 1955)
Minister of Finance:
Dumitru Petrescu (28 January 1953 - 4 October 1955)
Minister of the Metallurgy and Machine Building:
Carol Loncear (28 January - 17 October 1953)
Chivu Stoica (17 October 1953 - 4 October 1955)
Minister of the Chemical Industry:
Mihail Florescu (28 January 1953 - 4 October 1955)
Minister of Petroleum :
Ion Dumitru (28 January 1953 - 4 October 1955)
Minister of Coal:
Eugen Alexandru Matyas (28 January 1953 - 4 April 1955)
Ioan Mineu (4 April - 4 October 1955)
Minister of Electricity and Electrotechnical Industry:
Gheorghe Gaston Marin (28 January 1953 - 18 May 1954)
Gheorghe Cioară (18 May 1954 - 4 October 1955)
Minister of Construction and Building Materials:
Gheorghe Roșu (28 January 1953 - 8 October 1954)
Minister of Construction:
Gheorghe Hossu (8 October 1954 - 4 October 1955)
Minister of Building Materials:
Carol Loncear (8 October 1954 - 4 October 1955)
Minister of Light Industry:
Alexandru Sencovici (28 January 1953 - 4 October 1955)
Minister of Agriculture:
Constantin Prisnea (28 January - 5 November 1953)
Gheorghe Apostol (5 November 1953 - 18 May 1954)
Constantin Popescu (18 May 1954 - 4 October 1955)
Minister of Wood, Paper and Pulp Industries:
Mihai Suder (28 January 1953 - 4 October 1955)
Minister of Food Industry:
Dumitru Diaconescu (28 January - 17 October 1953)
Petre Borilă (17 October 1953 - 4 October 1955)
Minister of Meat, Fish, and Milk Industries:
Pascu Ștefănescu (28 January - 17 October 1953)
Minister of State Agricultural Farms:
Ion Vidrașcu (28 January - 5 November 1953)
Minister of Communes and Local Industry:
Anton Vlădoiu (28 January 1953 - 4 October 1955)
Minister of Forestry:
Constantin Popescu (28 January - 5 November 1953)
Minister of Collectivisation:
Mihai Dalea (15 February - 4 October 1955)
Minister of Internal Trade:
Vasile Malinschi (28 January 1953 - 16 February 1954)
Mircea Oprișan (16 February 1954 - 4 October 1955)
Minister of External Trade:
Alexandru Bârlădeanu (28 January 1953 - 18 May 1954)
Marcel Popescu (18 May 1954 - 4 October 1955)
Minister of Railways:
Ionel Diaconescu (28 January 1953 - 4 October 1955)
Minister of Shipping and Air Transport:
Gheorghe D. Safer (28 January 1953 - 4 October 1955)
Minister of Post and Telecommunications:
Dumitru Simulescu (28 January 1953 - 4 October 1955)
Minister of Social Provisions:
Stela Enescu (28 January 1953 - 10 June 1954)
Octavian Berlogea (10 June 1954 - 4 October 1955)
Minister of Health:
Octavian Berlogea (28 January 1953 - 10 June 1954)
Voinea Marinescu (10 June 1954 - 4 October 1955)
Minister of Public Education:
Ion Nistor (28 January - 6 October 1953)
Minister of Higher Education:
Ilie Murgulescu (28 January - 6 October 1953)
Minister of Education:
Ilie Murgulescu (6 October 1953 - 4 October 1955)
Minister of Culture:
Constanța Crăciun (30 November 1953 - 4 October 1955)
Minister of Religious Affairs:
Petre Constantinescu-Iași (28 January 1953 - 4 October 1955)

Minister Secretaries of State
Chairman of the State Planning Commission: (with rank of Minister)
Miron Constantinescu (28 January 1953 - 4 October 1955)

Chairman of the State Control Commission: (with rank of Minister)
Petre Borilă (28 January - 17 October 1953)
Mihai Gavriliuc (17 October 1953 - 4 April 1955)
Dumitru Coliu (4 April - 4 October 1955)

Chairman of the State Supply Commission: (with rank of Minister)
Emil Stanciu  (28 January - 30 November 1953)

Chairman of the Collectivisation of Agricultural Products Commission: (with rank of Minister)
Ion Olteanu (28 January 1953 - 15 February 1955)
Mihai Dalea (15 February - 4 October 1955)

Chairman of the Film Commission: (with rank of Minister)
Nicolae Bellu (28 January - 30 November 1953)

Chairman of the Art Commission: (with rank of Minister)
Nicolae Popescu-Doreanu (28 January - 30 November 1953)

Chairman of the Architecture and Systematisation Commission: (with rank of Minister)
Nicolae Bădescu (28 January 1953 - 4 October 1955)

References

Cabinets of Romania
Cabinets established in 1953
Cabinets disestablished in 1955
1953 establishments in Romania
1955 disestablishments in Romania